The Hillbilly Outfield: Kentucky Derby party is hosted annually by a group of volunteers called the Hillbilly Coalition, to benefit the Make A Wish Foundation. The Hillbilly Outfield Kentucky Derby party began in 2001, and is one of the biggest Kentucky Derby parties in Louisville. Because of its location in Middletown, Kentucky, being a part of the Louisville metropolitan area and fairly far from the actual Derby, it was named the "Outfield". This is jokingly a reference to the famous Infield at the Kentucky Derby. The event consists of an entire weekend of drinks, food, live music, audio and video Derby coverage, games, and much more. Most importantly, however, the driving motivation behind the event is that it is a non-profit event with no paid personnel solely to raise funds for the Make-A-Wish Foundation. The Hillbilly Outfield is becoming a Kentucky Derby tradition for many, and will become more and more of a tradition with every new Derby season. Between 400 and 500 people are in attendance each year. Ticket prices range between $50-$70, and cover food, drinking (non-alcoholic), camping space and entertainment. The Hillbilly Outfield supplies beers for only $1 each, including brands like Coors and Samuel Adams. The Hillbilly Outfield has been featured countless times as a must-attend event by many sources including various news channels, horse magazines, ESPN and Sports Illustrated.

The Coalition
 Beau Schuster - President
 Jim Hafendorfer - Treasurer/Host
 Greg Gish - Secretary/Artist
 Jennifer Hafendorfer - Public Relations
 Mark Yenowine - Zoning Commissioner
 Dave McCarthy- The Horse Whisperer
 Debbie Raydon - "Wildlife/Gaming"
 Valerie Bronson - Vending
 Michael Wilson - Chief Bartender
Christina Jones and Olivia Wilson- Silent Auction

Artwork
The artwork for the event is of a unique taste, and has a great deal of influence on the magic and uniqueness of this Kentucky Derby party and its theme. There is a plethora of distinctive characters that appear every year in the artwork, with additional characters be incorporated annually. From year to year, they all seem to develop even more interesting and charming traits than before. The most important facet of the artwork is that every year it is based thematically on some related Derby event, such as this year's "Chow Wagon" and last year's "Air Show" theme.

Photos

See also
 Kentucky Derby Festival
 List of attractions and events in the Louisville metropolitan area

References

External links
 
 Make-A-Wish (Greater KY, OH, IN Chapter)

Kentucky Derby
Parties
Recurring events established in 2001
2001 establishments in Kentucky
May events
Middletown, Kentucky